Jon Thomas Chargois (born December 3, 1990) is an American professional baseball pitcher for the Miami Marlins of Major League Baseball (MLB). He has previously played in MLB for the Minnesota Twins, Los Angeles Dodgers, Seattle Mariners and Tampa Bay Rays, and for the Tohoku Rakuten Golden Eagles of Nippon Professional Baseball (NPB).

Career

Amateur career
Chargois attended Sulphur High School in Sulphur, Louisiana. He was named to the All-State team in 2009, his senior year. He then enrolled at Rice University to play college baseball for the Rice Owls baseball team as a first baseman and pitcher. In 2010, Chargois played (collegiate summer ball) with the Gold Panners of Fairbanks in the Alaska League and played in the famous Midnight Sun Game. In 2011, he played collegiate summer baseball with the Brewster Whitecaps of the Cape Cod Baseball League, and was named a league all-star. In 2012, his junior year, he had a 4–1 win–loss record with a 2.15 earned run average (ERA) in  relief innings pitched along with batting .323 in 51 games.

Minnesota Twins
The Minnesota Twins selected Chargois as a pitcher in the second round, with the 72nd overall selection, of the 2012 MLB draft. He signed with the Twins, receiving a $712,600 signing bonus. He appeared in 12 games for the Elizabethton Twins of the Rookie-level Appalachian League, pitching to a 1.69 ERA, and recording five saves in 16 innings. He underwent Tommy John surgery in 2013. After missing the 2013 and 2014 season with recovery from surgery, he pitched for the Twins in an instructional league after the 2014 season.

Chargois opened the 2015 season with the Fort Myers Miracle of the Class A-Advanced Florida State League. After pitching to a 1–0 record and a 2.40 ERA in 15 relief innings pitched, the Twins promoted Chargois to the Chattanooga Lookouts of the Class AA Southern League, where he finished the season with a 1–1 record and 2.73 ERA in 32 relief appearances. After the 2015 season, the Twins added Chargois to their 40-man roster. He began the 2016 season in Chattanooga, and after compiling a 1.54 ERA through  innings, received a promotion to the Rochester Red Wings of the Class AAA International League in May.

On June 10, the Twins promoted Chargois to the major leagues. The Twins returned him to Rochester following the game. Chargois appeared in the 2016 All-Star Futures Game and was called back up to the majors on August 10. He pitched in 25 games for the Twins in 2016, with a 1–1 record and 4.70 ERA in 23 innings pitched. His first major league win was on September 10 against the Cleveland Indians, when he pitched a scoreless 12th inning.

In 2017, Chargois was optioned to Rochester toward the end of spring training, where he was intended to be the team's closer After making two appearances for Rochester, Chargois went on the disabled list with an elbow injury. He missed the rest of the season while recovering from the injury, which was labeled as a stress reaction.

Los Angeles Dodgers
Chargois was claimed off waivers by the Los Angeles Dodgers on February 23, 2018. He split both 2018 and 2019 between the AAA Oklahoma City Dodgers and Los Angeles. With the Dodgers he was 3–4 with a 4.53 ERA in 60 games. Chargois was released by the Dodgers on December 28, 2019, to pursue an opportunity in Japan.

Tohoku Rakuten Golden Eagles
On January 9, 2020, Chargois signed with the Tohoku Rakuten Golden Eagles of the Nippon Professional Baseball (NPB). 
Chargois recorded an 0–3 record and 5.81 ERA with 19 strikeouts in 2020 with the Eagles. On December 2, 2020, he became a free agent.

Seattle Mariners
On February 9, 2021, Chargois signed a minor league contract with the Seattle Mariners organization that included an invitation to spring training. On May 9, 2021, Chargois was selected to the active roster.

Tampa Bay Rays
On July 29, 2021, the Mariners traded Chargois and Austin Shenton to the Tampa Bay Rays for Diego Castillo. Chargois made 25 appearances for the Rays to close out the year, registering a 5–1 record and 1.90 ERA with 24 strikeouts in 23.2 innings pitched.

On May 22, 2022, Chargois was placed on the 60-day injured list after aggravating his oblique injury in a rehab appearance for the Triple-A Durham Bulls.

Miami Marlins
On November 15, 2022, Chargois was traded to the Miami Marlins along with Xavier Edwards in exchange for Marcus Johnson and Santiago Suarez.

References

External links

1990 births
Living people
American expatriate baseball players in Japan
Baseball players from Louisiana
Brewster Whitecaps players
Chattanooga Lookouts players
Elizabethton Twins players
Fort Myers Miracle players
Los Angeles Dodgers players
Major League Baseball pitchers
Minnesota Twins players
Nippon Professional Baseball pitchers
Oklahoma City Dodgers players
People from Sulphur, Louisiana
Rice Owls baseball players
Rochester Red Wings players
Seattle Mariners players
Tampa Bay Rays players
Tohoku Rakuten Golden Eagles players
Alaska Goldpanners of Fairbanks players